André Guerreiro Rocha (born August 19, 1984) is a Brazilian soccer player.

Career

South America
Rocha began his professional career in 2002 as a right-back with Aguas de Lindoia Esporte Clube, a fourth division São Paulo-based club.  In 2004, after a short stint with Portuguesa Santista, he was purchased by Palmeiras of the top division, where he played one season.  In 2005, he joined Atletico Paranaense playing in 47 games, including nine appearances in the 2005 Copa Libertadores helping the team reach the finals.  He also made one appearance in 2007 Copa Sudamerica.
In February 2010 Rocha joined Ponte Preta a second division club.
In February 2013 André Rocha made his comeback to Brazil signing with Figueirense.

Major League Soccer
Rocha signed with FC Dallas on February 12, 2008, and made his MLS debut on March 30, 2008, in which he played all 90 minutes in a 1–1 tie against Chivas USA. During the 2008 season, Rocha led the team with eight assists, recording his first MLS career assist in a 3–3 tie against the Houston Dynamo on April 6, 2008, and his first MLS career goal on August 23, 2008, in a 1–1 tie against the Kansas City Wizards.

Greece
On August 31, 2010, Rocha signed a 2-year contract with Superleague Greece club Panetolikos.

References

Figueirense acerta com lateral-direito

External links

zerozero.pt 
furacao 

1984 births
Living people
Brazilian footballers
Brazilian expatriate footballers
Associação Atlética Portuguesa (Santos) players
Sociedade Esportiva Palmeiras players
Club Athletico Paranaense players
FC Dallas players
Panetolikos F.C. players
Figueirense FC players
CR Vasco da Gama players
Botafogo Futebol Clube (SP) players
Clube Atlético Bragantino players
PAS Lamia 1964 players
Esporte Clube Noroeste players
Tombense Futebol Clube players
Associação Portuguesa de Desportos players
Nacional Atlético Clube (SP) players
Expatriate soccer players in the United States
Expatriate footballers in Greece
Major League Soccer players
Campeonato Brasileiro Série A players
Campeonato Brasileiro Série B players
Association football defenders
Association football midfielders
Footballers from São Paulo